Christa Linder is a German film actress.

Selected filmography
 Condemned to Sin (1964)
 Kiss Kiss, Kill Kill (1966)
 Seven Vengeful Women (1966)
 The Strangler of the Tower (1966)
 Countdown to Doomsday (1966)
 The Rat Patrol Series TV S01E02 (1966)
 Day of Anger (1967)
 Lotus Flowers for Miss Quon (1967)
 Kommissar X – Drei grüne Hunde (1967)
 Vagabundo en la lluvia (1968)
 El águila descalza (1969)
 The Incredible Invasion (1971)
 Blood Feast (1972)
 Italian Graffiti (1973)
 Dracula in the Provinces (1975)
 Bel ami : l'emprise des caresses (1976)
 Hooper (film) (1978)
 Moonlight (TV movie) (1982)

References

Bibliography
 Thomas Weisser. Spaghetti Westerns: the Good, the Bad and the Violent. McFarland, 2005.

External links

1943 births
German film actresses
Living people
Miss Universe 1962 contestants